Mesorhizobium septentrionale is a gram-negative, aerobic, non-spore-forming bacteria from the genus Mesorhizobium which was isolated from Astragalus adsurgens in China.

References

External links
Type strain of Mesorhizobium septentrionale at BacDive -  the Bacterial Diversity Metadatabase

Phyllobacteriaceae
Bacteria described in 2004